Amanita hemibapha, commonly known as the half-dyed slender Caesar, is a species of agaric found in southeast Asia and Oceania, although some distribution reports may refer to different taxa.

Toxicity 
The variant Amanita hemibapha var. ochracea found in China has been reported to cause dizziness and nausea after eaten in large quantities. Thus, human consumption is generally not recommended. The species is also noted to be confusable with the lethally toxic Amanita subjunquillea.

See also 

 List of Amanita species

References

External links 

 
 

hemibapha
Fungi of Asia
Edible fungi
Fungi described in 1887
Taxa named by Miles Joseph Berkeley
Taxa named by Christopher Edmund Broome